Ivo Hélcio Jardim de Campos Pitanguy (July 5, 1926 – August 6, 2016) was a plastic surgeon based in Rio de Janeiro.

Pitanguy studied at the Bethesda North Hospital in Cincinnati, where he worked with John Longacre. Soon after, Pitanguy went to France and England where he studied plastic surgery.

In 1953 he began working at a Brazilian hospital. On December 17, 1961, a burning circus tent fell on 2,500 spectators in the Brazilian city of Niterói. Pitanguy treated burn victims for weeks on an emergency basis. He later referred to the event as life changing, as it taught him that for many, physical appearance was critical to living. Pitanguy founded a private clinic called Clínica Ivo Pitanguy in the Botafogo section of Rio de Janeiro where he operated on clients and trained surgeons.

Pitanguy was also a philanthropist. He renovated a ward at the public Santa Casa da Misericórdia Hospital in Rio where, for four decades, he offered free treatment.

Pitanguy was a member of the Academia Brasileira de Letras and of the Academia Nacional de Medicina.

The Pitanguy clinic in Rio also includes an auditorium and library for Pitanguy's lectures and writings for medical students. He died one day after carrying the Olympic flame in his wheelchair, ahead of the Rio 2016 Olympic games.

Notable patients
Pitanguy treated well-known patients, such as the former F1 race driver Niki Lauda, the former prime minister of Italy and media tycoon Silvio Berlusconi as well as the revolutionary Muammar Gaddafi.

References

Further reading
Joseph A. Page (1995), The Brazilians. Da Capo Press. .

Brazilian plastic surgeons
1926 births
2016 deaths
Brazilian people of French descent
Members of the Brazilian Academy of Letters
Members of the Brazilian Academy of Medicine
People from Belo Horizonte